The title "Pharaoh" is used for those rulers of Ancient Egypt who ruled after the unification of Upper and Lower Egypt by Narmer during the Early Dynastic Period, approximately 3100 BC. However, the specific title was not used to address the kings of Egypt by their contemporaries until the New Kingdom's 18th Dynasty, c. 1400 BC. Along with the title Pharaoh for later rulers, there was an Ancient Egyptian royal titulary used by Egyptian kings which remained relatively constant during the course of Ancient Egyptian history, initially featuring a Horus name, a Sedge and Bee (nswt-bjtj) name and a Two Ladies (nbtj) name, with the additional Golden Horus, nomen and prenomen titles being added successively during later dynasties.

Egypt was continually governed, at least in part, by native pharaohs for approximately 2500 years, until it was conquered by the Kingdom of Kush in the late 8th century BC, whose rulers adopted the traditional pharaonic titulature for themselves. Following the Kushite conquest, Egypt experienced another period of independent native rule before being conquered by the Achaemenid Empire, whose rulers also adopted the title of "Pharaoh". The last native pharaoh of Egypt was Nectanebo II, who was pharaoh before the Achaemenids conquered Egypt for a second time.

Achaemenid rule over Egypt came to an end through the conquests of Alexander the Great in 332 BC, after which it was ruled by Hellenic Pharaohs of the Ptolemaic Dynasty. Their rule, and the independence of Egypt, came to an end when Egypt became a province of Rome in 30 BC. Augustus and subsequent Roman emperors were styled as Pharaoh when in Egypt until the reign of Maximinus Daza in 314 AD.

The dates given in this list of pharaohs are approximate. They are based primarily on the conventional chronology of Ancient Egypt, mostly based on the Digital Egypt for Universities database developed by the Petrie Museum of Egyptian Archaeology, but alternative dates taken from other authorities may be indicated separately.

Ancient Egyptian king lists 
Modern lists of pharaohs are based on historical records and, including Ancient Egyptian king lists and later histories, such as Manetho's Aegyptiaca, as well as archaeological evidence. Concerning ancient sources, Egyptologists and historians alike call for caution in regard to the credibility, exactitude and completeness of these sources, many of which were written long after the reigns they report. An additional problem is that ancient king lists are often damaged, inconsistent with one another and/or selective.

The following ancient king lists are known (along with the dynasty under which they were created):
 Den seal impressions (1st Dynasty); found on a cylinder seal in Den's tomb. It lists all 1st Dynasty kings from Narmer to Den by their Horus names.
 Palermo Stone (5th Dynasty); carved on an olivine-basalt slab. Broken into pieces and thus today incomplete.
 Giza writing board (6th Dynasty); painted with red, green and black ink on gypsum and cedar wood. Very selective.
 South Saqqara Stone (6th Dynasty); carved on a black basalt slab. Very selective.
 Karnak King List (18th Dynasty); carved on limestone. Very selective.
 Abydos King List of Seti I (19th Dynasty); carved on limestone. Very detailed, but omitting some of the Kings from First Intermediate Period and all the kings from Second Intermediate Period of Egypt.
 Abydos King List of Ramesses II (19th Dynasty); carved on limestone. Very selective.
 Ramesseum king list (19th Dynasty); carved on limestone. Contains most of the New Kingdom pharaohs up to Ramesses II.
 Saqqara Tablet (19th Dynasty), carved on limestone. Very detailed, but omitting most kings of the 1st Dynasty for unknown reasons.
 Turin King List (19th Dynasty); written with red and black ink on papyrus. Likely the most complete king-list in history, today damaged.
 Medinet Habu king list (20th Dynasty); carved on limestone and very similar to the Ramesseum king list.
 Manetho's Aegyptiaca (Greek Period); possibly written on papyrus. The original writings are lost today and many anecdotes assigned to certain kings seem fictitious.

Predynastic Period 
The Predynastic Period ends around 3100 BC when Egypt was first unified as a single kingdom.

Lower Egypt 

Lower Egypt geographically consists of the northern Nile and the Nile delta.

The following list may be incomplete:

Upper Egypt 

Upper Egypt refers to the region up-river to the south of Lower Egypt.

Regrouped here are predynastic rulers of Upper Egypt belonging to the late Naqada III period, sometimes informally described as Dynasty 00:

Predynastic rulers: Dynasty 0 

Since these kings precede the First Dynasty, they have been informally grouped as "Dynasty 0". 

The following list of predynastic rulers may be incomplete:

Early Dynastic Period 

The Early Dynastic Period of Egypt stretches from around 3100 to 2686 BC.

First Dynasty 

The First Dynasty ruled from around 3100 to 2890 BC.

Second Dynasty 

The Second Dynasty ruled from 2890 to 2686 BC.

Old Kingdom 

The Old Kingdom of Egypt is the long period of stability and growth following the Early Dynastic Period and preceding the troubled First Intermediate Period. The kingdom spanned from 2686 to 2181 BC.

Third Dynasty 

The Third Dynasty ruled from 2686 to 2613 BC.

Fourth Dynasty

The Fourth Dynasty ruled from 2613 to 2496 BC.

Fifth Dynasty

The Fifth Dynasty ruled from 2496 to 2345 BC.

Sixth Dynasty

The Sixth Dynasty ruled from 2345 to 2181 BC.

First Intermediate Period

The First Intermediate Period (2183–2060 BC) is a period of disarray and chaos between the end of the Old Kingdom and the advent of the Middle Kingdom.

The Old Kingdom rapidly collapsed after the death of Pepi II. He had reigned for more than 64 and likely up to 94 years, longer than any monarch in history. The latter years of his reign were marked by inefficiency because of his advanced age. The union of the Two Kingdoms fell apart and regional leaders had to cope with the resulting famine.

The kings of the 7th and 8th Dynasties, who represented the successors of the 6th Dynasty, tried to hold onto some power in Memphis but owed much of it to powerful nomarchs. After 20 to 45 years, they were overthrown by a new line of pharaohs based in Herakleopolis Magna. Some time after these events, a rival line based at Thebes revolted against their nominal Northern overlords and united Upper Egypt. Around 2055 BC, Mentuhotep II, the son and successor of pharaoh Intef III defeated the Herakleopolitan pharaohs and reunited the Two Lands, thereby starting the Middle Kingdom.

Seventh and Eighth Dynasties

The Seventh and Eighth Dynasties ruled for approximately 20–45 years. They comprise numerous ephemeral kings reigning from Memphis over a possibly divided Egypt and, in any case, holding only limited power owing to the effectively feudal system into which the administration had evolved.
The list below is based on the Abydos King List dating to the reign of Seti I and taken from Jürgen von Beckerath's Handbuch der ägyptischen Königsnamen as well as from Kim Ryholt's latest reconstruction of the Turin canon, another king list dating to the Ramesside Era.

Ninth Dynasty

The Ninth Dynasty ruled from 2160 to 2130 BC.

The Turin King List has 18 kings reigning in the Ninth and Tenth Dynasties. Of these, twelve names are missing and four are partial.

Tenth Dynasty

The Tenth Dynasty was a local group that held sway over Lower Egypt and ruled from 2130 to 2040 BC.

Eleventh Dynasty

The Eleventh Dynasty originated from a group of Theban nomarchs serving kings of the 8th, 9th or 10th dynasty with roots in Upper Egypt that ruled from 2134 to 1991 BC.

The successors of Intef the Elder, starting with Mentuhotep I, became independent from their northern overlords and eventually conquered Egypt under Mentuhotep II.

Middle Kingdom

The Middle Kingdom of Egypt (2040–1802 BC) is the period from the end of the First Intermediate Period to the beginning of the Second Intermediate Period. In addition to the Twelfth Dynasty, some scholars include the Eleventh, Thirteenth and Fourteenth Dynasties in the Middle Kingdom.

The Middle Kingdom can be noted for the expansion of trade outside of the kingdom that occurred during this time.

Eleventh Dynasty cont.
The second part of the Eleventh Dynasty is usually considered to be the beginning of the Middle Kingdom of Egypt.

Enigmatic kings, only attested in Lower Nubia:

Twelfth Dynasty 

The Twelfth Dynasty ruled from 1991 to 1802 BC.

The position of a possible additional ruler, Seankhibtawy Seankhibra, is uncertain. He may be an ephemeral king, or a name variant of a king of the 12th or 13th Dynasty.

Second Intermediate Period

The Second Intermediate Period (1802–1550 BC) is a period of disarray between the end of the Middle Kingdom, and the start of the New Kingdom. It is best known as when the Hyksos, whose reign comprised the Fifteenth Dynasty, made their appearance in Egypt.

The Thirteenth Dynasty was much weaker than the Twelfth Dynasty, and was unable to hold onto the two lands of Egypt. Either at the start of the dynasty, c. 1805 BC or toward the middle of it in c. 1710 BC, the provincial ruling family in Xois, located in the marshes of the eastern Delta, broke away from the central authority to form the Canaanite Fourteenth Dynasty.

The Hyksos made their first appearance during the reign of Sobekhotep IV, and around 1720 BC took control of the town of Avaris (the modern Tell el-Dab'a/Khata'na), conquering the kingdom of the 14th dynasty. Sometime around 1650 BC the Hyksos, perhaps led by Salitis the founder of the Fifteenth Dynasty, conquered Memphis, thereby terminating the 13th dynasty. The power vacuum in Upper Egypt resulting from the collapse of the 13th dynasty allowed the 16th dynasty to declare its independence in Thebes, only to be overrun by the Hyksos kings shortly thereafter.

Subsequently, as the Hyksos withdrew from Upper Egypt, the native Egyptian ruling house in Thebes set itself up as the Seventeenth Dynasty. This dynasty eventually drove the Hyksos back into Asia under Seqenenre Tao, Kamose and finally Ahmose, first pharaoh of the New Kingdom.

Thirteenth Dynasty

The Thirteenth Dynasty (following the Turin King List) ruled from 1802 to around 1649 BC and lasted 153 or 154 years according to Manetho.

This table should be contrasted with Known kings of the 13th Dynasty:

The position of the following kings is uncertain:

Fourteenth Dynasty

The Fourteenth Dynasty was a local group from the eastern Delta, based at Avaris, that ruled from either 1805 BC or around 1710 BC until around 1650 BC.

The dynasty comprised many rulers with West Semitic names and is thus believed to have been Canaanite in origin. It is here given according to Ryholt; however, this reconstruction of the dynasty is heavily debated with the position of the five kings preceding Nehesy highly disputed.

The position and identity of the following pharaohs is uncertain:

The Turin King List provides additional names, none of which are attested beyond the list.

Fifteenth Dynasty

The Fifteenth Dynasty arose from among the Hyksos people who emerged from the Fertile Crescent to establish a short-lived governance over much of the Nile region, and ruled from 1674 to 1535 BC.

Abydos Dynasty

The Second Intermediate Period may include an independent dynasty reigning over Abydos from around 1650 BC until 1600 BC.

Four attested kings may be tentatively attributed to the Abydos Dynasty, and they are given here without regard for their (unknown) chronological order:

Sixteenth Dynasty

The Sixteenth Dynasty was a native Theban dynasty emerging from the collapse of the Memphis-based 13th dynasty around 1650 BC. They were finally conquered by the Hyksos 15th dynasty around 1580 BC.

The 16th dynasty held sway over Upper Egypt only.

The 16th Dynasty may also have comprised the reigns of pharaohs Sneferankhre Pepi III and Nebmaatre. Their chronological position is uncertain.

Seventeenth Dynasty

The Seventeenth Dynasty was based in Upper Egypt and ruled from 1650 to 1550 BC:

The early 17th Dynasty may also have included the reign of a pharaoh Nebmaatre, whose chronological position is uncertain.

New Kingdom

The New Kingdom (1550–1077 BC) is the period covering the Eighteenth, Nineteenth, and Twentieth dynasty of Egypt, from the 16th to the 11th century BC, between the Second Intermediate Period, and the Third Intermediate Period.

Through military dominance abroad, the New Kingdom saw Egypt's greatest territorial extent. It expanded far into Nubia in the south, and held wide territories in the Near East. Egyptian armies fought with Hittite armies for control of modern-day Syria.

Three of the best known pharaohs of the New Kingdom are Akhenaten, also known as Amenhotep IV, whose exclusive worship of the Aten is often interpreted as the first instance of monotheism, Tutankhamun known for the discovery of his nearly intact tomb, and Ramesses II who attempted to recover the territories in modern Israel/Palestine, Lebanon and Syria that had been held in the Eighteenth Dynasty. His reconquest led to the Battle of Qadesh, where he led the Egyptian armies against the army of the Hittite king Muwatalli II.

Eighteenth Dynasty 

The Eighteenth Dynasty ruled from c. 1550 to 1292 BC:

Nineteenth Dynasty 

The Nineteenth Dynasty ruled from 1292 to 1186 BC and includes one of the greatest pharaohs: Ramesses II the Great.

Twentieth Dynasty 

The Twentieth Dynasty ruled from 1190 to 1077 BC:

Third Intermediate Period

The Third Intermediate Period (1077–664 BC) marked the end of the New Kingdom after the collapse of the Egyptian empire at the end of the Bronze Age. A number of dynasties of Libyan origin ruled, giving this period its alternative name of the Libyan Period.

Twenty-First Dynasty

The Twenty-First Dynasty was based at Tanis and was a relatively weak group. Theoretically, they were rulers of all Egypt, but in practice their influence was limited to Lower Egypt. They ruled from 1077 to 943 BC.

Theban High Priests of Amun

Though not officially pharaohs, the High Priests of Amun at Thebes were the de facto rulers of Upper Egypt during the Twenty-first dynasty, writing their names in cartouches and being buried in royal tombs.

Twenty-Second Dynasty

The pharaohs of the Twenty-Second Dynasty were Libyans, ruling from around 943 to 728 BC.

Twenty-Third Dynasty

The Twenty-Third Dynasty was a local group, again of Libyan origin, based at Herakleopolis and Thebes that ruled from 837 to c. 735 BC.

Rudamun was succeeded in Thebes by a local ruler:

Twenty-Fourth Dynasty 

The Twenty-fourth Dynasty was a short-lived rival dynasty located in the western Delta (Sais), with only two pharaohs ruling from 732 to 720 BC.

Twenty-Fifth Dynasty 

Nubians invaded Lower Egypt and took the throne of Egypt under Piye although they already controlled Thebes and Upper Egypt in the early years of Piye's reign. Piye's conquest of Lower Egypt established the Twenty-fifth Dynasty which ruled until 656 BC.

They were ultimately driven back into Nubia, where they established a kingdom at Napata (656–590), and, later, at Meroë (590 BC – AD 500).

Late Period 

The Late Period runs from around 664 to 332 BC, and includes periods of rule by native Egyptians and Persians.

Twenty-Sixth Dynasty 

The Twenty-sixth Dynasty ruled from around 664 to 525 BC.

The son and successor of Nekau I, Psamtik I, managed to reunify Egypt and is generally regarded as the founder of the Twenty-sixth Dynasty.

Twenty-Seventh Dynasty

Egypt was conquered by the Persian Empire in 525 BC and constituted a satrapy as part of this empire until 404 BC. The Achaemenid Shahanshahs were acknowledged as Pharaohs in this era, forming the 27th Dynasty:

Several native rebellions took place during the 27th dynasty:

Twenty-Eighth Dynasty

The Twenty-eighth Dynasty lasted only 6 years, from 404 to 398 BC, with one pharaoh:

Twenty-Ninth Dynasty

The Twenty-ninth Dynasty ruled from 398 to 380 BC:

Thirtieth Dynasty

The Thirtieth Dynasty ruled from 379/8 until Egypt once more came under Persian rule  340 BC:

Thirty-First Dynasty 

Egypt again came under the control of the Achaemenid Persians. After the practice of Manetho, the Persian rulers from 340 to 332 BC are occasionally designated as the Thirty-first Dynasty:

Native rebellions again took place during the 31st dynasty:

Hellenistic period

Argead Dynasty

The Macedonian Greeks under Alexander the Great ushered in the Hellenistic period with his conquest of Persia and Egypt. The Argeads ruled from 332 to 309 BC:

Ptolemaic Dynasty

The second Hellenistic dynasty, the Ptolemies, ruled Egypt from 305 BC until Egypt became a province of Rome in 30 BC (whenever two dates overlap, that means there was a co-regency). The most famous member of this dynasty was Cleopatra VII, in modern times known simply as Cleopatra, who was successively the consort of Julius Caesar and, after Caesar's death, of Mark Antony, having children with both of them.

Cleopatra strove to create a dynastic and political union between Egypt and Rome, but the assassination of Caesar and the defeat of Mark Antony doomed her plans.

Caesarion (Ptolemy XV Philopator Philometor Caesar) was the last king of the Ptolemaic Dynasty of Egypt, and he reigned jointly with his mother Cleopatra VII of Egypt, from September 2, 47 BC. He was the eldest son of Cleopatra VII, and possibly the only son of Julius Caesar, after whom he was named. Between the alleged death of Cleopatra, on August 12, 30 BC, up to his own alleged death on August 23, 30 BC, he was nominally the sole pharaoh. It is tradition that he was hunted down and killed on the orders of Octavian, who would become the Roman emperor Augustus, but the historical evidence does not exist.

Native rebellions also took place under Greek rule:

Rome

Cleopatra VII had affairs with Roman dictator Julius Caesar and Roman general Mark Antony, but it was not until after her suicide (after Mark Antony was defeated by Octavian, who would later be Emperor Augustus Caesar) that Egypt became a province of the Roman Republic in 30 BC. Subsequent Roman emperors were accorded the title of pharaoh, although exclusively while in Egypt.

The last Roman emperor to be conferred the title of pharaoh was Maximinus Daza (reigned 311–313 AD).

See also

 Egyptian chronology
 History of Egypt
 List of Ancient Egyptian Royal Consorts

References

Further reading
 Breasted, J. H., History of Egypt from the Earliest Time to the Persian Conquest, 1909
 Cerny, J. 'Egypt from the Death of Ramesses III to the End of the Twenty-First Dynasty' in: The Middle East and the Aegean Region c.1380–1000 BC, Cambridge University Press, 1975 
 
 
 
 Dodson, Aidan and Hilton, Dyan. The Complete Royal Families of Ancient Egypt. Thames & Hudson. 2004. 
 Gardiner, Sir Alan, Egyptian Grammar: Being an Introduction to the Study of Hieroglyphs, Third Edition, Revised. London: Oxford University Press, 1964. Excursus A, pp. 71–76.
 Grimal, Nicolas, A History of Ancient Egypt, Blackwell Books: 1992
 
 Murnane, William J. Ancient Egyptian Coregencies, Studies in Ancient Oriental Civilization. No. 40. The Oriental Institute of the University of Chicago, 1977
 Rice, Michael, Who's Who in Ancient Egypt, Routledge 1999
 Ryholt, Kim & Bardrum, Steven, The Late Old Kingdom in the Turin King-list and the Identity of Nitocris. Zeitschrift für ägyptische Sprache und Altertumskunde 127. 2000.
 Shaw, Garry. The Pharaoh, Life at Court and on Campaign, Thames and Hudson, 2012.
 Wilkinson, Toby A. H., Early Dynastic Egypt, Routledge 1999, 
 Ventura Dr. R., Egypt, History & Civilisation Published by Osiris, PO Box 107 Cairo.
 Verner, Miroslav, The Pyramids – Their Archaeology and History, Atlantic Books, 2001,

External links
 Egyptian Royal Genealogy (Old Broken Link) 
 Manetho and the King Lists Review of different primary king lists
 Chronology Table - 0 Dynasty&History Period, by Dariusz Sitek Multi-pages of list of pharaohs in different king lists, without the god kings, in Egyptian hieroglyphs and English
 Egyptian Journey 2003: History: King Lists Hyperlink texts of the Manetho, Abydos & Turin king lists, without the god-kings
 Comparing the major Egyptian king lists Compares the Karnak, Adydos and Saqqara king lists
 Digital Egypt for Universities
 List of all female Pharaohs

Pharaohs
Pharaohs
Pharaohs
Pharaohs